Mirra Ginsburg (June 10, 1909 - December 26, 2000) was a 20th-century Jewish Russian-American translator of Russian literature, collector of folk tales and children's writer. Born in Bobruysk then in the Russian Empire she moved with her family to Latvia and Canada before they settled in the United States.

Bibliography

Own works 
 Kitten from One to Ten (1980) (Illustrated by Giulio Maestro)
 The Sun's Asleep Behind the Hill (1982) (Illustrated by Paul O. Zelinsky)
 Asleep, Asleep (1992) (Illustrated by Nancy Tafuri)
 Merry-Go-Round: Four Stories (1992) (Illustrated by Jose Aruego and Ariane Dewey)
 The King Who Tried to Fry an Egg on His Head (1994) (Illustrated by Will Hillenbrand)

Translations 
Mikhail Bulgakov. The Master and Margarita, 1967
Mikhail Bulgakov. The Fatal Eggs, 1968
Mikhail Bulgakov. Heart of a Dog, 1968
Yevgeny Zamyatin, We, 1972
Andrei Platonov. The Foundation Pit, 1973
Fyodor Dostoevsky. Notes from Underground, 1974

References

External links
 
 

1909 births
2000 deaths
Russian–English translators
American children's writers
20th-century American translators
20th-century American women writers
People from Babruysk
Jewish translators
Jewish American writers
Soviet emigrants to Canada
Canadian emigrants to the United States
Jewish women writers
20th-century American Jews